

History 
Luffenholtz was a former settlement in Humboldt County, California.

From 1904 to 1909, a post office operated at Luffenholtz.

The abandoned town site is currently part of Luffenholtz Beach County Park, with rocky coves and tide pools.

References

Former settlements in Humboldt County, California
Former populated places in California